Yettel may refer to:

 Yettel Bulgaria (formerly Telenor Bulgaria), Bulgarian telecommunications company
 Yettel Hungary (formerly Telenor, Pannon, and Pannon GSM), Hungarian telecommunications company
 Yettel Serbia (formerly Mobtel, Mobi 63, and Telenor), Serbian telecommunications company